Adan Canto (born December 5, 1981) is a Mexican actor. He is known for his role as Sunspot in the 2014 superhero film X-Men: Days of Future Past. On television, Canto played Paul Torres on the Fox drama series The Following, and in 2015 starred as AJ Menendez in the ABC prime-time series Blood & Oil. Canto played real-life politician Rodrigo Lara Bonilla in acclaimed Netflix drama series Narcos.  He is also well known for his role as Aaron Shore in the ABC/Netflix political drama Designated Survivor starring alongside Kiefer Sutherland as well as his current role on Fox drama The Cleaning Lady. Canto wrote and directed his first short film Before Tomorrow in 2014. He is also one of the starring characters in the romance film 2 Hearts. His short film The Shot  earned several festival awards for Best Narrative Short Film in 2020.

Early life 
Adán Canto was born in Ciudad Acuña, Coahuila, Mexico to parents José-Luis Narváez, a dentist, and Marlyn Canto-Narváez, a homemaker and singer. Born and raised in Mexico, Canto crossed the border daily as a child to attend an American Catholic school in Del Rio, Texas. He grew up riding horses at his grandfather's ranch in Acuña where his father was a charro. With the encouragement of his mother, Canto began performing on stage as a singer at the age of 7. He was introduced to the traditional boleros and mariachi music from a young age and performed in and around his home state through his teenage years.

Canto left home at the age of 16 to pursue a career as a musician. He had success as a singer/songwriter in San Antonio after collaborating with Studio M. He spent five years working as a musician in Mexico City where he performed as lead singer for the jazz band Del Canto. Canto wrote for and produced several songs for film and TV in Mexico. Canto began acting in a handful of commercials in Mexico City and was soon cast in a television series called Estado de Gracia. Canto eventually turned to the stage after being cast as a lead in the adaptation of Pedro Almodóvar's All About My Mother.

Career
In 2013, Canto made his debut on American television, playing the role of Paul Torres on the Fox drama series, The Following during its first season. He later was cast as Sunspot in the 2014 superhero film X-Men: Days of Future Past. Also in 2014, Canto was regular cast member in the ABC comedy series, Mixology. He later co-starred in the Amazon pilot Hysteria, and NBC's The Curse of the Fuentes Women. In 2015, Canto was cast as AJ Menendez in ABC prime time series, Blood & Oil.  He later had the recurring role in Fox drama series, Second Chance, and guest-starred on ShondaLand's The Catch.
In 2016, Canto was cast in the ABC political drama series, Designated Survivor, playing White House Deputy Chief of Staff, and later Chief of Staff Aaron Shore opposite Kiefer Sutherland, Natascha McElhone, and Maggie Q. The show was renewed by Netflix for a third season which was released on June 7, 2019.

In 2019, Canto was cast opposite Halle Berry in her highly anticipated directorial debut film Bruised.

Canto started his production company Canto House Pictures in 2013 and directed his first short film Before Tomorrow in 2014. Canto's most recent short film The Shot, a period drama set in 1844 Texas, earned several festival awards for Best Narrative Short Film in 2020.  Canto is currently developing projects for film and TV through his production company based in Los Angeles, California.

In March 2020, Canto was cast in a main role of mobster Arman Morales for the FOX series The Cleaning Lady.

Personal life
Canto met sculptor and painter Stephanie Lindquist in 2012 while filming The Following in Brooklyn, New York.

Their first artistic collaboration was the short film Before Tomorrow in 2014.

The two married in June 2017.  They continue to collaborate on film and television projects and currently live in the Hollywood Hills. They had their first child in 2020, and their second in 2022.

Filmography

Film

Television

References

External links
 
 

1981 births
Living people
Mexican expatriates in the United States
Mexican male film actors
Mexican male television actors
Male actors from Coahuila
People from Acuña, Coahuila